Rhypodillus is a genus of broad-nosed weevils in the beetle family Curculionidae. There are at least two described species in Rhypodillus.

Species
These two species belong to the genus Rhypodillus:
 Rhypodillus brevicollis (Horn, 1876) i c g b
 Rhypodillus dilatatus (Horn, 1876) i c g
Data sources: i = ITIS, c = Catalogue of Life, g = GBIF, b = Bugguide.net

References

Further reading

 
 
 
 

Entiminae
Articles created by Qbugbot